Kinfauns railway station served the village of Kinfauns, Perthshire, Scotland, from 1847 to 1950 on the Dundee and Perth Railway.

History 
The station opened on 24 May 1847 by the Dundee and Perth Railway.  The goods yard was to the northeast. The station closed to both passengers and goods traffic on 2 January 1950.

References

External links 

Disused railway stations in Perth and Kinross
Former Caledonian Railway stations
Railway stations in Great Britain opened in 1847
Railway stations in Great Britain closed in 1950
1847 establishments in Scotland
1950 disestablishments in Scotland